Liachavičy Castle was a fortified Belarus castle. It was one of the most significant castles in Belarus in the 17th century. It may have been in existence as a hill fort since the eleventh or twelfth century.

It was built at the end of the 16th century by the hetman Yan Eromin of the Hadkevich family, on a hill in the Belarus town of the same name. It stood on the bank of the Vedz'ma ("Witch") river, surrounded by a moat regulated by a dam. In the centre stood a two-storey palace. Eromin's son, Yan Korol, the hetman of the Great Lithuanian Principality, reconstructed and fortified the castle.

The 17th century occupants, the Sapieha family, fortified the castle such that it was the only castle in the region to survive the Cossack Khmelnitzky massacres and subsequent wars with Russia. The castle survived a siege in 1660, the only fortress in the Grand Duchy of Lithuania not to be captured by Russia during the Russo-Polish War (1654–67).

The castle and surrounding settlement was destroyed during the Great Northern War of 1700–21, after the Radziwiłł family had the crown requisition the cannons of Liachavičy for the defense of Słuck. The Swedish army burned the castle and a Catholic church to the ground in 1706.

See also
History of Belarus
Mir Castle Complex
Nesvizh Castle

References

Liahavichy Castle, Belarus
Liahovichi district history
Historical Sites of Lyakhovichi

Former castles in Belarus
Lyakhavichy